I Apologize, while credited to Ginuwine, is not an official release but has acceptance to his catalog. It peaked at No. 50 on the Billboard Top R&B/Hip-Hop Albums chart.

Youngblood and his wife Ginger both managed the recording artist, who hit number 50 on the charts. The album 'I Apologize' was released in Feb 13, 2007.

Background

 By the time I Apologize hit the shelves in 2007, Ginuwine had been working the R&B loverman vibe for over ten years. The artist's 2000s albums don't have the cutting edge that his mid-'90s work with Timbaland possessed, but they continue to impress, offering up a silky-smooth brew of contemporary production, pulsing beats, and the artist's knee-weakening croon. The title track, one of the album's highlights, gets things rolling with its moderate, bouncing groove, one of a handful of satisfying, head-nodding tracks. But Ginuwine is at his best on ballads like "Better Days," a song that not only showcases his vocal dexterity, but swells with an inspirational fervor that tips its hat to gospel. Ginuwine's mix of old-school R&B with a hip-hop flavored sensibility has always appealed; I Apologize is another fine example of its charm.

Sales

After its release on February 13, 2007, the album I Apologize was distributed to the stores for sale but soon after that there was a dispute regarding the copyright of the eight track (AllMusic). Apparently the CD had only three songs attributed to Ginuwine and the rest were by other undisclosed artists. It was therefore not an official release and official sales have not been concluded as this was an unauthorized album (AllMusic).

Track listing 
 "Intro" – 1:06
 "I Apologize" (Melvin "Melrog" Rogers, Ted Clinkscale, Elgin Lumpkin) – 4:20
 "Since I Found U" (featuring Tommy Redding) (P. Deleon, M. Edwards, V. Ichihara) – 3:01
 "Better Days" (featuring Tommy Redding) (Tommy Redding) – 4:25
 "Happy at Home" (featuring I-Rocc) (R. Eddington, S. Groves, B. Houston, I. Woods) – 3:19
 "Say When" (featuring Tommy Redding) (T. Redding) – 5:09
 "It's Real" (featuring Racheul Evans) (Clinkscale, Edwards, R. Evans, Groves, Lumpkin, Rogers, J. Williams) – 4:14
 "What's It Gunna Be" (featuring Tommy Redding) (Eddington, Groves, Redding) – 3:26
 "Like Me" (featuring G-Dep and Loon) (Eddington, Groves, Chauncey Hawkins, B. Houston) – 4:04
 "Twerk" (featuring Tommy Redding) (Clinkscale, Redding, Rogers) – 3:30
 "I Apologize" (remix) (featuring Smigg Dirtee, B-Way) (Clinkscale, Lumpkin, Rogers) – 3:20
 "Outro" – 0:25

Personnel

 Mike Eddy- Primary Artist (Track 3, "Since I found u) 
 Rachel Evans- Primary artist 
 G. Dep-  Featured Artist, Primary Artist (Track 9, "Like me")  
 Ginuwine-  Main Personnel, Primary Artist, Vocals 
 Hartman the Hit Man-  Producer 
 I-Rocc-  Primary Artist (Track 5, "Happy at home") 
 Loon- Featured artist, primary artist (Track 9, "Like me")  
 Jayz- Engineer 
 Reason- Vocals 
 T- Redding- Engineer, producer (Track 6, "say when") 
 Tommy Redding- Primary artist (tracks 4,6,8&10) 
 Melvin Rogers-  Audio production, producer (Tracks 1,2,7,10,11,12) 
 Smigg Dirtee- Primary artist (Track 11 "I apologize (Remix)") 
 Peter  Wonder – Producer

Charts and certifications

Leon Derrick Youngblood SR took his recording artist Tommy Redding to audition for Columbia Records immediately after the release of this album, Even though it was not an official release, and on a low budget,  I apologize reached No .29 on the Top Independent Albums charts and No. 50 on the R&B Albums charts that year.

References

Huey, Steve. "About Ginuwine." MTV Artists BETA. Viacom International Inc. Web. 5 July 2014
Huey, Steve. "Ginuwine." AllMusic. All Media Network LLC, n.d. Web. 29 June 2014
"I Apologize - Ginuwine | Credits | AllMusic." AllMusic. N.p., n.d. Web. 15 July 2014.
"I Apologize." MSN Music. N.p., n.d. Web. 15 July 2014.
Sangweni, Yolanda. "Exclusive: Listen to TGT's new Album "Three Kings"." Essence. Essence Communications Inc. 13 August 2013. Web. 8 July 2014

2007 albums
Ginuwine albums